Gerardus Bernardus Marie Cornelis (Gerard) Thoolen (14 February 1943, in Oss – 12 October 1996, in Amsterdam) was a Dutch stage and film actor best known for his role in the film Private Resistance (1985).

Career
Thoolen played his first leading role in 1980 in the filmThe Mark of the Beast by Pieter Verhoeff. Besides playing in Dutch films, Thoolen also participated in films by the British film director Peter Greenaway, A Zed & Two Noughts (1985) and Prospero's Books (1991).

Awards
 1984 Golden Calf (award) De mannetjesmaker
 1984 Golden Calf (award) The Illusionist (1983 film)
 1985 Best actor on the Taormina Film Fest for his role in Private Resistance

References

External links

20th-century Dutch male actors
Male actors from Amsterdam
1943 births
1996 deaths
Dutch male film actors
Dutch male television actors